The 1937 San Diego State Aztecs football team represented San Diego State College during the 1937 college football season.

San Diego State competed in the Southern California Intercollegiate Athletic Conference (SCIAC). The 1937 San Diego State team was led by head coach Leo B. Calland in his third season with the Aztecs. They played home games at Aztec Bowl in San Diego, California. The Aztecs finished the season as champion of the SCIAC, with seven wins and one loss (7–1, 4–1 SCIAC). Overall, the team scored 90 points for the season while giving up only 16. That included shutting out their opponents in 6 of the 8 games. The only blemish on the season was a one-point loss to Redlands.

Schedule

Team players in the NFL
No San Diego State players were selected in the 1938 NFL Draft.

Notes

References

San Diego State
San Diego State Aztecs football seasons
Southern California Intercollegiate Athletic Conference football champion seasons
San Diego State Aztecs football